Operation Creek (also known as Operation Longshanks) was a covert military operation undertaken by Britain's Special Operations Executive in World War II on 9 March 1943. It involved a nighttime attack by members of the Calcutta Light Horse and the Calcutta Scottish against a German merchant ship, the Ehrenfels, which had been transmitting information to U-boats from Mormugao Harbour in neutral Portugal's territory of Goa. The attack was successfully carried out, and the Ehrenfels and three other Axis merchant ships were sunk, stopping the transmissions to the U-boats.

Background
With the outbreak of the Second World War in 1939, three German freighters operated by the DDG Hansa, the Ehrenfels, the Braunfels and the Drachenfels, took refuge in the harbour of Mormugao, Goa. They did so because Portugal was neutral during the war while the British territory of India was not. In 1940, they were joined by an Italian vessel, the Anfora. All British citizens on board were permitted to disembark. However, the crew soon ran out of supplies. This led to some abandoning the ships to pursue odd jobs in Goa for money. While the British were aware of the presence of the ships, they did not perceive them to be a threat since they were merchant ships.

However, in 1942 the India Mission of the Special Operations Executive (SOE) at Meerut intercepted coded messages to German Navy U-boats, relaying detailed information on the positions of Allied ships leaving Bombay Harbour in the Indian Ocean. Subsequently, in autumn of that year forty-six Allied merchant ships were attacked. The SOE then discovered that a Gestapo spy, Robert Koch (known as the "Trumpet") and his wife Grete were living in Panaji, the capital of Goa. SOE agents Lieutenant colonel Lewis Pugh and Colonel Stewart went to Goa in November 1942 and kidnapped Robert and Grete Koch on 19 December. The couple was taken to Castle Rock, Karnataka, for questioning as part of Operation Hotspur.

The Kochs vanish from the records shortly afterwards, with conflicting reports on their ultimate fate. The SOE now suspected a secret transmitter aboard the Ehrenfels was guiding German U-boat attacks against Allied shipping, on instructions from Koch. Attacks in the Indian Ocean continued, and in the first week of March 1943, German U-boats sank twelve American, Norwegian, British and Dutch ships a total of roughly 80,000 tons.

The British could not infringe on Portugal's neutrality by openly invading its territory. The SOE decided to try a covert operation without the involvement of regular British armed forces. The SOE chose fourteen volunteers from the Light Horse and four more from the Calcutta Scottish to perform a covert operation led by Pugh: to capture or sink the Ehrenfels.

Assault
After being armed and trained by the SOE, some of the eighteen member-assault team embarked on a hopper barge, the Phoebe, at Calcutta and sailed around India to Goa; the rest took train from Calcutta to Cochin and joined the barge and its crew there.

Around midnight of 9–10 March 1943, the town of Vasco da Gama, where Mormugao harbour is located, was celebrating the last day of Carnival. One team member used SOE funds to throw a large party in Vasco, inviting crews of all ships in harbour to attend - which left only a small crew on board the Ehrenfels.

Due to a "coincidence", both the lighthouse and luminous buoy of Mormugao harbour were not working that night, allowing the Phoebe to enter the harbour in darkness. The British team attacked the Ehrenfels, killing its captain and some of the crew, and capturing the ship and its transmitter. After the ship had been captured, some of the crew members of the Ehrenfels opened the ship's sea valves and sank it. The British team suffered no casualties in the operation, and left on the Phoebe.

The crews of the other merchant ships in the harbour, the Drachenfels, the Braunfels and the Anfora, seeing the Ehrenfels on fire and sinking, scuttled their ships to protect them from capture by the British. As the Phoebe left Mormugao harbour it transmitted the codeword "Longshanks" to SOE headquarters, indicating that all Axis ships had been sunk. Five crew members of the Ehrenfels were reported dead (including the captain), with four more reported missing.

Aftermath

After the attack, the thirteen German U-boats operating in the Indian Ocean only sank one ship, the Panamanian Nortun of 3,663 tons, throughout the rest of March. In the following month of April, they only attacked three ships.

The crew aboard the four scuttled ships had jumped overboard and swam to the shore, where they were captured by the Portuguese and held in Aguada jail. Local news reported that they had mutinied. On 1 October 1943, the Judicial Court of Mormugao stated that there had been no attack by a foreign ship and convicted the crew members for the scuttling of their ships, imprisoning them until the end of the war. While in jail, they lived a good life, bribing the authorities and even roaming freely in the compound. While some infiltrated into British India and then escaped to their native countries after being set free, some of the Germans settled down in Goa and started families there, facing an uncertain future in Germany.

Since the attack was a secret, the members of the British assault team received no official recognition of their part in the war effort. The members of the Calcutta Light Horse designed a memento for themselves: a seahorse. The Light Horse and the Calcutta Scottish were decommissioned in 1947 following the independence of India. It was only in 1974 that the British Government declassified documents of the operation.

In 1951 the remains of the four merchant ships were salvaged by the Mormugao Port Trust, the port at the site of the battle, with the help of one of the Germans who chose to stay behind in Goa. In 2017, the port announced that it would salvage the remnants of the ships for scrap.

In 2002, records released from the British National Archives revealed that three of the Axis crew members had surrendered to the British and had joined the SOE's operations in India, where they worked until they were allowed to go back to their country after the war ended. The records also suggested that Operation Creek was meant to capture the Axis ships, which was not possible only because their respective crews had scuttled them.

In popular culture
The world became aware of the exact events of the operation only in 1978, when the story of Operation Creek was told in the book, Boarding Party, by journalist James Leasor. It was dramatised in the 1980 film The Sea Wolves starring Gregory Peck, Roger Moore and David Niven.

In the foreword of Boarding Party, the Earl Mountbatten of Burma wrote:

References

Special Operations Executive operations
Creek
Battles and operations of World War II involving India
1943 in India
March 1943 events